The Press-Enterprise is a paid daily newspaper published by Digital First Media that serves the Inland Empire in Southern California. Headquartered in downtown Riverside, California, it is the primary newspaper for Riverside County, with heavy penetration into neighboring San Bernardino County. The geographic circulation area of the newspaper spans from the border of Orange County to the west, east to the Coachella Valley, north to the San Bernardino Mountains, and south to the San Diego County line. The Press-Enterprise is a member of the Southern California News Group.

The newspaper traces its roots to The Press, which began publishing in 1878, and The Daily Enterprise, which started publishing in 1885. The two papers were merged into one company in 1931, but the company did not begin publishing a daily morning paper named The Press-Enterprise until 1983. A. H. Belo acquired the company in 1998. In October 2013, A.H. Belo announced that it had reached an agreement to sell The Press-Enterprise's assets to Freedom Communications, parent company of the Orange County Register, for $27 million; after some delays, the transaction closed in late November. Freedom declared bankruptcy in 2015, the Register and the Press-Enterprise were sold in a bankruptcy auction to Digital First Media in March 2016.

The Press-Enterprise'''s local competitors are the San Bernardino Sun and the Inland Valley Daily Bulletin, along with sharing some of its western circulation areas with the Orange County Register and The Californian (of Temecula) in the southwest area.

History
The Riverside Press was first published on June 29, 1878, by James Roe, a druggist and teacher.  In 1880 Roe sold the newspaper to Luther M. Holt, who, for several years, published the paper under the name the Riverside Press and Horticulturist.  In 1886 Holt began issuing the paper daily.The Riverside Daily Enterprise was first published in 1885 by David F. Sarber, and became a county paper in 1896 when it absorbed the Perris Valley Record and the Moreno Valley Indicator.  The paper was published somewhat sporadically through 1911 by various owners, and under various names, including; Riverside Weekly Enterprise, Riverside Semi-weekly Enterprise, Weekly Enterprise, and the Morning Mission.  In 1912, The Enterprise was sold to the owners of the San Bernardino Sun.

In 1931 The Press purchased The Enterprise from the San Bernardino Sun.  The newly combined company issued The Enterprise in the morning, and The Press in the evenings.  In 1954 the Riverside Press changed its company name to the Press-Enterprise Company, and in 1955 the two papers began printing a joint Sunday edition called the Sunday Press-Enterprise.  Due to market conditions, the two papers were combined into one morning paper, The Press-Enterprise, in 1983.

The Dallas-based A.H. Belo Corporation purchased The Press-Enterprise Company from the Hays family through multiple acquisitions in 1997 and 1998.
Enterprise Media was formed in 2010 and released a B2B website, enterprisemedia.co.

In 2013, The Press-Enterprise was sold to Freedom Communications for $27 million.

On March 21, 2016, The Press-Enterprise and its sister newspaper the Orange County Register were sold to Digital First Media, after Freedom Communications declared bankruptcy and was placed in an auction which included Tribune Publishing. With Digital First Media as its new owner, it now expands to 11 daily newspapers, six in Los Angeles County, three in San Bernardino County, one in Orange County, and one in Riverside County.

Pulitzer Prize
The Press-Enterprise won the 1968 Pulitzer Prize for meritorious public service for its exposé of corruption in the courts in connection with the handling of the property and estates of the Agua Caliente Indian tribe of Palm Springs, California. The series was written by George Ringwald.

Supreme Court cases
The Press-Enterprise Company won two separate United States Supreme Court cases that established the public's right to witness specific aspects of criminal court proceedings.

The first case, won in 1984, was Press-Enterprise Co. v. Superior Court of California, Riverside County. In a case involving the rape and murder of a teenage girl, the Press-Enterprise requested that the voir dire, the process of questioning the jury, be open to the public and press.  The request was denied, as well as the request for the subsequent transcripts, and upheld by the California Court of Appeal.  The California Supreme Court denied the Press-Enterprise's request for a hearing.  The United States Supreme Court decided in favor of the Press-Enterprise, establishing that the public has the right to attend jury selection during criminal trials.

The second case, won in 1986, was also called Press-Enterprise Co. v. Superior Court of California. The case involved Robert Diaz who was accused of 12 patient murders while acting as a nurse at the Community Hospital of the Valleys in Perris, California.  The defendant requested that the public be excluded from the proceedings.  The Magistrate granted the unopposed request because of the national attention that the case had garnered.  At the end of the hearing the Press-Enterprise'' requested that the transcripts be released, but the request was denied and the records were sealed.  The United States Supreme Court decided that the public has the right to attend pretrial hearings in criminal cases, including preliminary hearings.

See also

 Tim Hays
 James Ward

References

External links
 

Daily newspapers published in Greater Los Angeles
Mass media in the Inland Empire
Mass media in Riverside, California
Mass media in Riverside County, California
Mass media in San Bernardino, California
Companies based in Riverside, California
Companies that filed for Chapter 11 bankruptcy in 2009
Companies that filed for Chapter 11 bankruptcy in 2015
Publications established in 1878
1878 establishments in California
Digital First Media
Freedom Communications
Pulitzer Prize-winning newspapers
Pulitzer Prize for Public Service winners